Vaazhl is a 2021 Indian Tamil-language drama film directed by Arun Prabu Purushothaman and produced by Sivakarthikeyan under his banner Sivakarthikeyan Productions. The film features a predominantly new cast and crew, which includes Pradeep Anthony, TJ Bhanu, Diva Dhawan, Aahrav and SN Bhatt in prominent roles. The film's music is composed by Pradeep Kumar, with cinematography handled by Shelly Calist and editing done by Raymond Derrick Crasta.

The project was originally produced by R. D. Raja of 24AM Studios and subsequently launched in May 2018. But Arun Prabhu went on a recce for location scouting, which delayed the principal photography process. Further Raja stepped out of producing the venture citing financial constraints, and the rights for the film production were acquired by Sivakarthikeyan in June 2019. Filming began in mid-January 2019 and completed within that July, within a duration of 75 days. The film was shot across 100 unexplored locations across India and at islands in Indonesia and Papua New Guinea.

Vaazhl released through the streaming service SonyLIV on 16 July 2021, as a theatrical release planned earlier was failed to happen due to COVID-19 related cinema closures. The film opened to positive reviews from critics, praising the performances of the cast members, storyline, direction, music and cinematography, but criticised the lack of depth and the slow-paced narration in the second half.

Plot 
Prakash is an IT programmer living with his parents and younger sister. His day-to-day life is dull and monotonous, his professional life is a mess and his love life is not exciting. Prakash's other sister who lives abroad is pregnant and his parents visit her to help with her delivery.

Prakash meets Yathramma (she is only known as Yathra’s mother throughout the movie) at a relative's funeral and is smitten by her beauty at first sight. To his disappointment, he finds that she is older than him, is married and has a son, Yathra. Yathra has ADHD disorder and is extremely hyperactive and destructive, but Yathramma is very protective of him, even to her husband. One night, when Yathra throws a tantrum, his father loses his patience and threatens him to sleep in his own room. Yathramma tries to stop him but he is angry at her as well. The argument leads to a violent confrontation when Yathramma hits her husband with a piece of wood and kills him by accident. She panics, hides his dead body in the fridge, takes some money and leaves with Yathra in her car. She lands on Prakash's doorstep under the guise of borrowing money and asks Prakash to take care of Yathra for a few hours. She finds that Prakash has been patient in spite of Yathra's destructive behavior. Yathramma requests Prakash to accompany them to Nagercoil to return the borrowed money to her friend. Prakash is unable to resist her innocent charm and agrees. During their travel, Yathramma insists that Prakash take longer routes and they go from city to city. Prakash eventually becomes suspicious of Yathramma's intentions and asks her the real reason. But she uses her vile charm to shut his questions down yet again. They become close after this and make love. However, Yathramma attempts suicide the next day, but the locals of a town save her. When Prakash questions her this time around, Yathramma comes clean about murdering her husband and tells that since they have become so close, she feels that she can now leave Yathra under Prakash's care and die. Prakash is shocked at this and wants out, but she indirectly threatens him using a phrase she taught Yathra to tell everyone. When asked, Yathra shouts that Prakash and Yathramma had sex. Prakash is scared out of his wits and stops the car to get water. Yathra goes with him leaving Yathramma behind, when a truck hits the car and kills Yathramma instantly.

Prakash is horrified at the terrible turn of events and is left with no choice but to take Yathra with him. When questioned by the police, Yathra relays the entire story, that Prakash had sex with his mom and his real father is dead. Prakash is arrested and the police also arrest a Bolivian woman Tanya, with fake passports and take them both to the police station. Tanya fights the cops and forces Prakash to escape along with Yathra. They reach a resort where Tanya helps Prakash calm down. In a bid to escape the police, she uses fake passports and takes Prakash and Yathra to Papua New Guinea. She encourages Prakash to travel, live his life and explore nature to achieve fulfillment in life. Their adventures take them across land, water, mountains and rivers to explore.

Meanwhile in India, the police find a video confession from Yathramma proving Prakash's innocence. His parents try to reach him desperately, but Tanya, Yathra and Prakash travel to a remote village and spend time with the aborigines. Tanya receives a call to travel elsewhere, so she leaves Prakash and Yathra, knowing fully well that Prakash is now confident enough take care of himself. Prakash and Yathra then travel to another remote island and continue their adventure. On one such river rafting trips, their raft capsizes and Prakash is thrown off the river and goes down a waterfall. Yathra is stuck in the shallow water and moves to land by himself and wanders alone in the forest. Prakash gets his leg stuck under a rock and faints, but he regains consciousness and manages to get himself out of the water. He searches for Yathra and finally finds him, realizing that he has grown to love Yathra as his own child. They travel back to India, where Prakash's family accepts Yathra. Prakash returns to work a transformed person and is able to achieve success. He fondly reminisces his experience with Yathramma and his adventures with Tanya, her words resounding in his mind, reminding him to take time off for himself no matter how important his work and family are.

Cast 

 Pradeep Anthony as Prakash
 TJ Bhanu as Yathramma
 Diva Dhawan as Tanya
 Aahrav as Yathra
 SN Bhatt

Production

Development 
Post the release of Aruvi, director Arun Prabhu Purushothaman worked on the pre-production and writing of his second project which is eventually stated it as his first script but eventually not materialized. He added that the script is quite complicated and was not an easy process to transform it completely on screen, which took him more time for the writing. He narrated the script first to actor Sivakarthikeyan years ago before its writing. Sivakarthikeyan, who was impressed by Arun's narration eventually gave his nod to the script, but it did not happen as planned.

On 29 May 2018, film producer R. D. Raja of 24AM Studios announced their next venture in collaboration with Arun Prabhu, which is touted to be a mixed-genre film similar to Aruvi. Prabhu retained the same technical crew from his first film, which includes Shelley Calist, Raymond Derrick Crasta and Shreeraman as the cinematographer, editor and production designer respectively, but the film's cast and crew were not deciphered by the producers. During the time of production, in June 2019, the film's producer Raja stepped out due to the financial constraints surrounding his production house, 24AM Studios, which also affected the company's other projects. Subsequently, Sivakarthikeyan, speaking at the audio launch of his second production venture Nenjamundu Nermaiyundu Odu Raja, announced Arun Prabhu's project officially as his third venture for Sivakarthikeyan Productions. The first look of the film officially released on 27 June 2019 revealing the title of the film as Vaazhl.

Filming 
A formal pooja ceremony for the film was officially held on 30 May at Theni. Work on the film's shooting progressed silently in January 2019, despite the film's launch in mid-2018, as Arun Prabhu and his team went on a recce for the locations which took them nine months. An article from The News Minute stated that a 90-year old nonagenarian actor will play the lead, although the film's team did not disclose the cast, but it was reported that the film will have newcomers in the lead roles who had no experience in acting.

In an interview with an online portal, Prabhu stated that the film has been shot in 100 unexplored locations across Tamil Nadu, Kerala and Karnataka, and also at several islands in Indonesia and Papua New Guinea. It was touted to be a surprise factor in the film. A part of the film was shot in film camera, as according to Prabhu, the team used different cameras for different portions of the film's screenplay. For a small portion set in the 1930s, the makers used the film camera touting that it was the best way to authentically show that time period. The film's shooting which took place on 75 days was wrapped in July 2019, and post-production of the film commenced soon after the film's shooting being completed, although dubbing works of the film began in October 2019.

Soundtrack 

The film's music is composed by playback singer-turned-composer Pradeep Kumar who also wrote the lyrics for the songs along with the director Arun Prabhu Purushothaman and lyricists Muthamil and Kutti Revathi, who worked with the director in Aruvi. In July 2018, Arun Prabhu posted on Twitter about the music sessions of the film with a music team in Cincinnati in the United States. In an interview with The Times of India, Prabhu stated that "The film is a mixed genre, but the narrative of the film is musical; there are several songs in it as well and they have come out so beautifully." One of the tracks titled "Seemaan Magalai is based on poet Arunagirinathar's works from Kandar Anuboothi, and also features a dual version performed by Gina Mirenda.

On 7 September 2020, Sony Music South released the lyrical video of the first song "Aahaa", which was released in all digital platforms as the first single. Zoom TV, stated the film's song as an "emotional number with holds a certain amount of breeziness that is beautiful and it also sets the right kind of mood for the film." On 27 January 2021, the makers unveiled the second track of the film titled "Feel Song", which was sung by veteran film composer Deva. The album in its entirety was released on 9 July 2021, at a special audio launch event which was streamed live through YouTube. The event also featured the presence of the few cast and crew members, with a musical performance hosted by Pradeep Kumar performing all the songs for the album.

The album opened to positive reviews from music critics. Behindwoods gave a rating of 3 out of 5 and said that the album has "mesmerizing bunch of tracks that flows like one unending symphonious waterfall". Vipin Nair of Music Aloud rated the album 3.5 out of 5 and summarised "Pradeep Kumar creates an immersive musical experience for Vaazh and the texture of the soundtrack works brilliantly backed by the orchestral sounds throughout the soundtrack."

Release 
Vaazhl was initially scheduled for theatrical release, but due to COVID-19 related cinema closures, the makers discussed with popular digital streaming service SonyLIV which was set to debut in the South Indian market after the success of their Hindi originals distributed. The film had a direct-to-digital release through SonyLIV on 16 July 2021.

Reception 
Thinkal Menon of The Times of India gave the film 3 out of 5 and stated that the film "emphasises the need to explore life and live for today" and "might appeal to those who love motivational and travel flicks". Behindwoods gave the film 3 out of 5 and wrote "Vaazhl has a lot of takeaways for the viewers, coupled with strong technical work. If the engagement was better and screenplay issues were sorted, Vaazhl could have given us the experience of a lifetime. Nevertheless, this film cannot be dismissed easily, and credits must be given where it is due." Ramya Palisetty of India Today gave the film 3 out of 5 and said "Vaazhl has a good story at its heart but it somehow fails in execution. Nevertheless, it has its moments when you are lost in nature and its beauty."

Manoj Kumar R. of The Indian Express gave 3.5 out of 5 stars with a review: "Vaazhl is a product of personal filmmaking. It is smart, funny and even hallucinatory. The philosophical theme and the existential questions that the film tackles are not unheard of. But, the way Arun navigates this familiar territory of spiritual quest with a burst of colourful and soothing images with composer Pradeep Kumar’s meditative score keeps us invested in the narration." Sify gave the film 3 out of 5 stars saying "Vaazhl is a well made feel-good film that will motivate us to travel more and most importantly encourages us to live only for today and not to worry about tomorrow."

Sudhir Srinivasan of The New Indian Express wrote "Even if this film isn’t as satisfying as the director’s debut, Aruvi, director Arun Prabhu Purushothaman shows that he isn’t here to make easy films. And that single realisation gives you more happiness than the film did."

In contrast, Ranjani Krishnakumar of Firstpost gave the film 2.5 out of 5 stars saying "Vaazhl lacks self-awareness, only engaging with the romanticised idea of nature". Haricharan Pudipeddi of Hindustan Times wrote "Vaazhl feels stretched towards the end when it tries hard to pack in too much. It sometimes feels superficial but nevertheless manages to make an impact with its intended message. It makes interesting observations about an abusive relationship and how most women are unable to free themselves. The pleasant visuals and good music make up for most of the film’s dull moments." Srivatsan S of The Hindu called the film lacks the spine that knits its rather non-linearity in a cohesive manner" and further added that "Arun Prabu tries to defy the framework of a screenplay. In doing so, it ends up looking like a science experiment gone wrong".

References

External links 

 

2020s Tamil-language films
2021 direct-to-video films
2021 drama films
2021 films
Films about travel
Films not released in theaters due to the COVID-19 pandemic
Films shot in Indonesia
Films shot in Karnataka
Films shot in Kerala
Films shot in Papua New Guinea
Films shot in Tamil Nadu
Indian direct-to-video films
Indian drama films